Cressa or Kressa was an ancient Greek city located in ancient Thrace, on the Thracian Chersonesus. It is cited in the Periplus of Pseudo-Scylax, in the second position of its recitation of the towns of the Thracian Chersonesus, along with Aegospotami, Cressa, Crithote and Pactya. It may be the same town cited by Pliny the Elder as Crissa on the Propontis.

See also
Greek colonies in Thrace

References

Populated places in ancient Thrace
Former populated places in Turkey
Greek colonies in the Thracian Chersonese
History of Çanakkale Province